Pomegranates are an indie rock band from Cincinnati, Ohio.  They briefly changed their name to Healing Power before disbanding, but they reverted to Pomegranates when reforming the band.

Members

Current
 Joey Cook: vocals, bass, guitars, keyboards
 Isaac Karns: vocals, bass, guitars, keyboards
 Jacob Merritt: drums
 Pierce Geary: bass, keys, vocals

Former
 Karl Spaeth: guitars, bass
 Josh Kufeldt: guitars, bass
 Daniel Lyon: vocals, guitars
 Curt Kiser: guitars, bass, vocals

Discography

Studio albums
 Everything Is Alive (Lujo Records), 2008
 Everybody Come Outside (Lujo Records), 2009
 One of Us  (Afternoon Records), 2010
 Heaven (Modern Outsider), 2012
 Healing Power (Winspear), 2015

EPs
 Two Eyes (Lujo Records), 2007
 In Your Face Thieves/Chestnut Attic (Lujo Records), 2011

Singles

 Corriander b/w Sleepover (Lujo Records), 2009

References

External links
 Pomegranates Tumblr
 Pomegranates Myspace
 Pomegranates artist page at Lujo Records
 Pomegranates on Indieshuffle
 Pomegranates on Last.fm
 
Pomegranates artist page at Winspear

Indie rock musical groups from Ohio
Musical groups from Cincinnati